Geron Christian Sr. (born September 10, 1996) is an American football offensive tackle for the Miami Dolphins of the National Football League (NFL). He played college football at Louisville and was drafted by the Washington Redskins in the third round of the 2018 NFL Draft. He has also played for the Houston Texans and Kansas City Chiefs.

Early years
Christian graduated from Trinity Catholic High School in Ocala, Florida in 2015 after transferring from West Port High School, also located in Ocala. Along with football, he also played basketball. A 3-star offensive line recruit, Christian originally committed to play football for Miami, but later flipped his commitment to Louisville over offers from Arkansas, East Carolina, Florida Atlantic, Middle Tennessee State, Mississippi State, and Texas.

College career
Christian played college football for Louisville from 2015 to 2017, starting all 39 games of his career since joining the team as a true freshman. After his junior season in 2017, he declared for the 2018 NFL Draft.

Professional career

On January 3, 2018, Christian announced his decision to forgo his senior season and enter the 2018 NFL Draft. He elected to enter the draft although the NFL's underclass advisory committee told him he would probably not be selected in the first or second round. Christian attended the NFL Scouting Combine in Indianapolis and chose to only perform the 40-yard dash, 20-yard dash, 10-yard dash, bench press, and positional drills. On March 29, 2018, he participated at Louisville's pro day, but opted to stand on the majority of his combine numbers and only performed the bench press (22 reps). He also attended pre-draft visits and private workouts with the New York Giants, Detroit Lions, and Denver Broncos. At the conclusion of the pre-draft process, Christian was projected to be a fourth round pick by the majority of NFL draft experts and scouts. He was ranked the fourth best offensive tackle in the draft by Scouts Inc., was ranked the 10th best offensive tackle by Sports Illustrated, and was ranked the 11th best offensive tackle prospect in the draft by DraftScout.com.

Washington Redskins / Football Team
The Washington Redskins selected Christian in the third round (74th overall) of the 2018 NFL Draft. Christian was the seventh offensive tackle drafted in 2018. Christian signed his four-year rookie contract, worth $3.74 million, on June 24, 2018. He played in two games before suffering a torn medial collateral ligament in Week 10 and placed on injured reserve on November 13, 2018.

At the start of the 2020 season, Christian was named the starting left tackle replacing Trent Williams, who was traded to the San Francisco 49ers during the offseason, and Donald Penn, whom the team chose not to re-sign. He started the first six games before suffering a knee injury in Week 6. He missed the next three games before being placed on injured reserve on November 19, 2020. Christian was waived on May 20, 2021.

Houston Texans
Christian was claimed off waivers by the Houston Texans on May 21, 2021.

Kansas City Chiefs
On March 24, 2022, Christian signed a one-year deal with the Kansas City Chiefs.

Christian was waived by the Chiefs on January 4, 2023, after Mecole Hardman was activated off of injured reserve.

Miami Dolphins
On January 5, 2023, Christian was claimed off waivers by the Miami Dolphins.

Christian signed a one-year contract extension with the Dolphins on March 16, 2023.

Personal
Christian is younger brother of tight end Gerald Christian, who was the Mr. Irrelevant of the 2015 NFL Draft.

References

External links
Louisville Cardinals bio

1996 births
Living people
American football offensive tackles
Houston Texans players
Kansas City Chiefs players
Louisville Cardinals football players
Miami Dolphins players
Players of American football from Florida
Sportspeople from Ocala, Florida
Washington Football Team players
Washington Redskins players